BMP/retinoic acid inducible neural specific 3 is a protein that in humans is encoded by the BRINP3 gene.

Function

This gene is overexpressed in pituitary tumors but is underexpressed in tongue squamous cell carcinomas, ulcerative colitis, and peri-implantitis. Polymorphisms that increase expression of this gene have been shown to increase vascular inflammation, and an association of this gene with myocardial infarction has been demonstrated. Finally, hypermethylation of this gene may find usefulness as a biomarker for gastric cancer. Two transcript variants encoding different isoforms have been found for this gene. [provided by RefSeq, Nov 2015].

References

Further reading